Sabarimala Ayyappa Seva Samajam (SASS) is an organization of Ayyappan devotees and an affiliate of the Sangh Parivar. It is a registered public charitable trust started on 13 November 2008 with headquarters at Pathanamthitta in Kerala. SASS aims to serve Ayyappa devotees in their pilgrimage to Sabarimala and inculcate dharmic values in them and their families and bring them together to further the larger aim of Hindu unity. SASS activities can be listed in 5S: Satsang, Swaadhyay, Seva, Samarasta and Sangharsh.

Sabarimala Ayyappa Seva Samajam was established as a charitable trust with the revered Guruswamy MN Nambiar as Chairman together with Hindu activist Kummanam Rajasekharan as its first General Secretary.

Activities 
The activities of Sabarimala Ayyappa Seva Samajam are 
 Various services like Annadanam (offering free food), medical facilities, other necessary assistance to Sabarimala pilgrims
To set up base camps and Seva Kendra (Help Centres) for Sabarimala pilgrims
 Organizing devotees of Ayyappa through weekly gathering, Satsang, Uthram Pooja, etc. throughout the year, to create awareness among people about Ayyappa Dharma and Sanatana Dharma
 Conducting Swach Sabarimala programme for cleaning and sanitation work in Sannidhanam, Pampa and Erumeli in association with Punyam Poonkavanam Project
 Organizing awareness campaigns on plastic free Sabarimala and plastic free Erumely through Ayyappa Yogams

References

Hindu organizations
Sangh Parivar
Charitable trusts
2008 establishments in India